Rhigognostis is a genus of butterfly belonging to the family Plutellidae.

The genus was first described by Zeller in 1857.

The species of this genus are found in Europe and Northern America.

Species:
 Rhigognostis kuusamoensis Kyrki, 1989

References

Plutellidae